Luther Franklin Clifford Jr. (January 16, 1924 – May 4, 1990), nicknamed "Shanty", was an American Negro league catcher in the 1940s.

A native of Clairton, Pennsylvania, Clifford attended Clairton High School. He played for the Homestead Grays during their 1948 Negro World Series championship season. Clifford went on to play minor league baseball in the Mandak League with the Brandon Grays in 1952. He died in Brantford, Ontario in 1990 at age 66.

References

External links
 and Seamheads

1924 births
1990 deaths
Homestead Grays players
Baseball catchers
Baseball players from Pennsylvania
People from Clairton, Pennsylvania
20th-century African-American sportspeople